Geert Jan Derksen (born 2 May 1975 in Didam) is a Dutch rower. He won silver at the men's eight event at the 2004 Summer Olympics in Athens. He also competed at the 2000 Summer Olympics.

References

External links 
 

1975 births
Living people
People from Montferland
Sportspeople from Gelderland
Dutch male rowers
Rowers at the 2000 Summer Olympics
Rowers at the 2004 Summer Olympics
Olympic rowers of the Netherlands
Olympic silver medalists for the Netherlands
Olympic medalists in rowing
Medalists at the 2004 Summer Olympics